The Taurini were a Celto-Ligurian tribe dwelling in the upper valley of the river Po, around present-day Turin, during the Iron Age and the Roman period.

Name 
They are mentioned as Taurĩnoí (Ταυρῖνοί) by Polybius (2nd c. BC), Taurini by Livy (late 1st c. BC), Taurinoí (Ταυρινοί) by Strabo (early 1st c. AD), Taurinorum by Pliny (1st c. AD), and as Taurínōn (Ταυρίνων; var. Ταυρικῶν, Ταυρινῶν) by Ptolemy (2nd c. AD).

The ethnic name Taurini can be translated as 'the tribe of the bull'. It is either an older form of the metathesized Celtic noun taruos ('bull'), or a non-Celtic Ligurian form.

Geography 
The Taurini lived between the Dora Riparia and the upper Po river. Their territory was located east of the Iemerii, west of the Libicii and Iadatini.

Their original capital, Taurasia, was destroyed by the Carthaginians after they opposed in vain Hannibal's march into Italy in 218 BC. It was refounded by the Romans after 25 BC as Colonia Augusta Taurinorum (modern Turin), at the confluence of the Dora and Po. The settlement was hit by a fire in 69 AD.

History
They were involved in Rome's wars against the Celts at the end of the 4th century BC.

In 218 BC, they were attacked by Hannibal, who had allied with their long-standing enemies, the Insubres. Their chief town was captured by Hannibal's forces after a three-day siege.

Culture 
The ethnic identity of the Taurini is unclear. They have been variously described as Celts, Ligurians, or Celticized Ligurians.

See also
 List of ancient peoples of Italy

References

Bibliography

Further reading
 

Historical Celtic peoples
Gauls
Ligures